Braulio Antonio Godínez Durán (born 27 March 1984 in Silao), known as Braulio Godínez, is a Mexican retired footballer, who played as defender for Alebrijes de Oaxaca of Liga MX.

Club career
After making his Mexican Primera División debut with C.F. Pachuca in 2003, Godínez has spent most of his career playing for Indios de Ciudad Juárez or its affiliate clubs. In 2012, when Indios were dissolved he returned to Liga de Ascenso side Dorados de Sinaloa.

Notes

References

External links
 
 
 

1984 births
Living people
Footballers from Guanajuato
People from Silao, Guanajuato
Association football defenders
Mexican footballers
C.F. Pachuca players
Indios de Ciudad Juárez footballers
Dorados de Sinaloa footballers
La Piedad footballers
Alebrijes de Oaxaca players
C.F. Mérida footballers
Lobos BUAP footballers